Vitruvian Park is a multi-family, retail and commercial development in Addison, Texas. The development is just west of the Dallas North Tollway, approximately one mile north of I-635/LBJ Freeway between Midway Road and Marsh Lane in Addison's southwest quadrant. Adjacent to the community are Brookhaven Country Club, Brookhaven College, Greenhill School, Parish Episcopal School, and a shopping center.   In addition to being the largest development ever undertaken by major real estate developer UDR, Inc., the  development is also Addison's first major sustainable green initiative.  

The park draws its design from  Roman architect Vitruvius' only surviving work, De Architectura.   Savoye, the first phase was designed to feature 744 multifamily housing units,  of retail and a  public park including a spring-fed creek, bridges and trails.

In December 2012, the City of Addison debuted the Vitruvian Lights: Magical Nights of Lights, in which the park was decorated with 1.2 million light bulbs in nine different colors on more than 500 trees. It subsequently became an annual event. The park hosted its second "Vitruvian Lights" in 2013.

Reference list

External links

 

Buildings and structures in Dallas County, Texas
Apartment buildings in Texas
Commercial buildings in Texas